Chebet, also transliterated as Jebet and Chepet, is a surname of Kenyan origin. Notable people with the surname include:

Ben Chebet Kipruto (born 1982), Kenyan marathon runner based in Italy
Emily Chebet (born 1986), Kenyan runner and world cross country champion
Irene Chepet Cheptai (born 1992), Kenyan runner and world cross country medallist
Joseph Chebet (born 1970), Kenyan runner and winner of the 1999 Boston and New York Marathons
Peter Chebet (born 1974), Kenyan marathon runner
Ruth Chebet (born 1996), Kenyan-born long-distance runner for Bahrain
Wilson Chebet (born 1985), Kenyan professional road runner

See also
Florence Jebet Kiplagat (born 1987), Kenyan runner and 2009 world cross country champion
Lydia Jebet Rotich (born 1988), Kenyan steeplechase athlete
Nancy Jebet Langat (born 1981), Kenyan middle-distance runner and 2008 Olympic champion
Salina Jebet Kosgei (born 1976), Kenyan runner and winner of the 2009 Boston Marathon

Kalenjin names